David Antonio Rugamas Leiva (born 17 February 1990 in San Juan Opico, La Libertad, El Salvador) is a Salvadoran professional football player, who plays as a forward.

Club career

Juventud Independiente 
In 2013, Rugamas signed with Juventud Independiente.

Isidro Metapán 
In 2015, he signed with A.D. Isidro Metapán.

Loan to Al-Mina'a 
In August 2016, Rugamas was loan to Al-Mina'a.

Águila 
Rugamas signed with Águila for the Apertura 2017. Rugamas left the club in July 2018.

FAS 
Rugamas signed with FAS for the Apertura 2018. He scored a crucial goal in a 2–0 victory against Isidro Metapán, in the second leg of the quarter-finals of the Apertura 2018, in December 2018.

International career

International goals
Scores and results list El Salvador's goal tally first.

References 

1990 births
Living people
Salvadoran footballers
El Salvador international footballers
C.D. Juventud Independiente players
Expatriate footballers in Iraq
Expatriate footballers in Thailand
Salvadoran expatriate sportspeople in Iraq
Al-Mina'a SC players
David Rugamas
David Rugamas
Association football forwards
2019 CONCACAF Gold Cup players
Salvadoran expatriate sportspeople in Thailand
A.D. Isidro Metapán footballers
Alianza F.C. footballers
Salvadoran expatriate sportspeople in Guatemala
Expatriate footballers in Guatemala
2021 CONCACAF Gold Cup players